Vladimir Vladimirovich Bortko (born 7 May 1946) is a Russian film director, screenwriter, producer and politician. He was a member of the State Duma between 2011 and 2021, and was awarded the title of People's Artist of Russia.

Biography
Vladimir Bortko was born 7 May 1946 in Moscow. He grew up in the family of the Ukrainian Soviet playwright Oleksandr Korniychuk. After his studies in the Geological College in Kyiv and his military service in 1965-1966, he worked three years as an electrical engineer in Kyiv.

In 1969 he went to the Karpenko-Kary State University of Theatre, Film and Television in Kyiv. After graduating in 1974 he worked as an assistant director at the Dovzhenko Film Studios. In 1975 he was directing his first film, entitled Channel.

In 1980, Vladimir Bortko became production leader in the Kinostudiya Lenfilm in Leningrad, the largest film production company of the Soviet Union after Mosfilm in Moscow. He received relative fame in the Soviet Union, but his big breakthrough came with the film adaptation of the novel Heart of a Dog by the Russian author Mikhail Bulgakov, which was awarded with a Grand Prix at the Film Festival in Perugia.

In 1991 he made Afghan Breakdown, a Soviet-Italian film about the Soviet withdrawal from Afghanistan with Michele Placido in the lead, critical of the Soviet military activity. During the troubled shooting that started in Tajikistan in 1990 one of the team members, Nikita Matrosov, was killed by Tajik ultra-nationalists following the 1990 Dushanbe riots. According to Bortko, most of their equipment was destroyed as well, the team was evacuated, and the shooting was finished in Crimea and Syria.

After the turn of the century Vladimir Bortko realized two of the biggest projects in the history of Russian cinema for the television channel Telekanal Rossiya. The first was an adaptation of the novel The Idiot written by the Russian author Fyodor Dostoevsky into a television series of 10 episodes in 2002. The series clinched all the major television prizes in Russia, and actor Yevgeny Mironov received the award for Best Actor at the Monte Carlo Television Festival.

Three years later followed an adaptation of the novel The Master and Margarita written by Mikhail Bulgakov, also into a TV series of 10 episodes. The first broadcast of December 19, 2005 was preceded by months of controversy in the media.

In 2009, Bortko caused another big controversy, followed by a huge public success, with his film adaptation of the historical novel Taras Bulba written by the Russian author Nikolai Gogol. This time the criticism came from Ukraine, because while Bortko allowed the Polish actors in the film to speak Polish, the Ukrainian Cossacks had to express themselves in poor Russian. The film had nearly 4 million paying visitors in Russian cinemas.

Bortko is a member of the Communist Party of the Russian Federation (CPRF).

In March 2014 he signed a letter in support of the position of the President of Russia Vladimir Putin on Russian annexation of Crimea.

In 2022, during the Russian invasion of Ukraine, Bortko cried live on TV as a result of the sinking of the Russian cruiser Moskva in the Black Sea, saying that this was "a real casus belli for the war against Ukraine".

Major projects

Film and television

1974 – Doctor (thesis short film)
1975 – Channel
1980 – My Father Is an Idealist
1984 – Without Family
1984 – The Blonde Around the Corner
1987 – Once Lied
1988 – Heart of a Dog
1991 – Afghan Breakdown
1998 – The Circus Burned Down, and the Clowns Have Gone
2000 – Gangsters of Saint Petersburg (TV series)
2002 – The Idiot (TV series)
2005 – The Master and Margarita (TV series)
2009 – Taras Bulba
2011 – Peter the Great: The Testament

Theatre

1993 – Oedipus Rex
2010 – Malleus Maleficarum

References

External links
  Vladimir Bortko in the Internet Movie Data Base
  Heart of a Dog in the Internet Movie Data Base
  The Idiot in the Internet Movie Data Base
  The Master and Margarita in the Internet Movie Data Base
  Taras Bulba in the Internet Movie Data Base

Soviet film directors
Russian film directors
Academicians of the Russian Academy of Cinema Arts and Sciences "Nika"
Russian people of Ukrainian descent
Ukrainian film directors
1946 births
Living people
Ukrainian Soviet Socialist Republic people
Communist Party of the Russian Federation members
Solzhenitsyn Prize winners
Academicians of the National Academy of Motion Picture Arts and Sciences of Russia
Recipients of the Order of Honour (Russia)
Recipients of the title of People's Artists of Ukraine
Soviet male film actors
Soviet screenwriters
Male screenwriters
20th-century Russian screenwriters
20th-century Russian male writers
Russian film producers
Kyiv National I. K. Karpenko-Kary Theatre, Cinema and Television University alumni
Communist Party of the Soviet Union members
Recipients of the Vasilyev Brothers State Prize of the RSFSR
Russian actor-politicians
Sixth convocation members of the State Duma (Russian Federation)
Seventh convocation members of the State Duma (Russian Federation)
Anti-Ukrainian sentiment in Russia